Corrective Revolution, Corrective Movement, or Corrective Step may refer to:
Corrective Revolution (Egypt), a reform or change in policy introduced by Anwar Sadat
Corrective Movement (Syria), a reform program in Syria when Assad took power
Corrective Move, a South Yemeni internal coup within National Liberation Front in 1969

See also
2013 Egyptian coup d'état, the coup plotters initially announced that a Corrective Revolution had occurred